Township 1 is a township in Rooks County, Kansas, United States. Woodston is the largest population center in Township 1.

History
Rooks County was established with four townships: Bow Creek, Lowell, Paradise and Stockton. That number increased to seven by 1878 and twenty three in 1925. The twenty three townships were in place until 1971 when the number was reduced to the current twelve townships.

Township 1 was formed from Rooks County townships Ash Rock, Lowell and Medicine in 1971 pursuant to Kansas Statute 80-1110. 80-1110 allowed for the disorganization of townships and assigning those territories to contiguous townships.

Buros Creek flows through the northern part of Township 1 into South Fork Solomon River. Medicine Creek flows through the southern part of Township 1 into South Fork Solomon River.

Ash Rock Township
Ash Rock Township was established in 1877 from part of Lowell Township. The township was named for a petrified tree trunk found by an early settler, H. C. Olds. The Stone Church built in 1883 is a landmark from Ash Rock township.

Lowell Township
Lowell Township was one of the four original Rooks County civil townships along with Bow Creek, Paradise and Stockton. The original Lowell Township was 18 miles north-to-south (3 survey townships). The west border was with Bow Creek and Stockton Townships. The east border the Osborne County line making it 9 miles (1-1/2 survey townships) wide. Lowell originally included territory that would become Ash Rock, Medicine and parts of Greenfield, Iowa and Lanark townships.

The South Fork Solomon River traversed Lowell Township.

Medicine Township
Medicine Township was established in 1879 from part of Lowell Township. The township was named for Medicine Creek that traversed the township to the South Fork Solomon River. Medicine Creek was called "heap big medicine" by Native Americans.

References

Townships in Rooks County, Kansas
Townships in Kansas